In Concert on Broadway is an album by Harry Connick Jr., released in 2011. The album reached a peak position of number 76 on the Billboard 200 and number 2 on the Billboard Jazz Albums chart.

Track list

References

2011 albums
Columbia Records albums
Harry Connick Jr. albums